Line fitting is the process of constructing a straight line that has the best fit to a series of data points.

Several methods exist, considering:

Vertical distance: Simple linear regression
Resistance to outliers: Robust simple linear regression
Perpendicular distance: Orthogonal regression
Weighted geometric distance: Deming regression
Scale invariance: Major axis regression

See also
Linear least squares
Linear segmented regression
Linear trend estimation
Polynomial regression
Regression dilution

Further reading
"Fitting lines", chap.1 in LN. Chernov (2010), Circular and linear regression: Fitting circles and lines by least squares, Chapman & Hall/CRC, Monographs on Statistics and Applied Probability, Volume 117 (256 pp.). 

Regression analysis
Geometric algorithms